USS Alecto (AGP-14) was a  built for the United States Navy during World War II.

Construction
Alecto was laid down on 12 December 1944, at Hingham, Massachusetts, by the Bethlehem-Hingham Shipyard; launched on 15 January 1945; acquired by the Navy and placed in commission on 8 February 1945, for movement to Baltimore, decommissioned there on 23 February 1945, for conversion by the Maryland Drydock Co. to a motor torpedo boat tender; and recommissioned on 28 July 1945.

Service history
The tender got underway on 6 August, for shakedown training in the Chesapeake Bay and, on 2 September, was assigned to Service Forces, Atlantic Fleet. Following a period of training and upkeep at Norfolk, Virginia, she sailed for Albany, New York, on 14 October, and arrived there two days later.

Alecto moored at the Army Supply Depot at Albany and began servicing motor torpedo boats. On 10 November, the ship moved to Melville, Rhode Island, and engaged in repair work for Motor Torpedo Boat Squadron (MTBRon) 4. In January 1946, she made two voyages from Melville to Solomons Island, Maryland, transporting equipment for MTBRon 4 and, from March through May, she was stationed there. She sailed to Charleston, South Carolina, in early June, and was placed out of commission there on 28 June 1946. Her name was struck from the Navy list on 28 June 1947. The vessel was transferred to the government of Turkey on 10 May 1948, and was later renamed Onaran (A581).

Notes

Citations

Bibliography 

Online resources

External links
 

 

1945 ships
Portunus-class motor torpedo boat tenders
Ships built in Hingham, Massachusetts
LST-542-class tank landing ships